In number theory, a Behrend sequence is an integer sequence whose multiples include almost all integers. The sequences are named after Felix Behrend.

Definition
This means that the proportion of the integers from 1 to  that belong to  converges, in the limit of large , to one.

Examples
The prime numbers form a Behrend sequence, because every integer greater than one is a multiple of a prime number. More generally, a subsequence  of the prime numbers forms a Behrend sequence if and only if the sum of reciprocals of  diverges.

The semiprimes, the products of two prime numbers, also form a Behrend sequence. The only integers that are not multiples of a semiprime are the prime powers. But as the prime powers have density zero, their complement, the multiples of the semiprimes, have density one.

History
The problem of characterizing these sequence was described as "very difficult" by Paul Erdős in 1979.

These sequences were named "Behrend sequences" in 1990 by Richard R. Hall, with a definition using logarithmic density in place of natural density. Hall chose their name in honor of Felix Behrend, who proved that for a Behrend sequence , the sum of reciprocals of  must diverge. Later, Hall and Gérald Tenenbaum used natural density to define Behrend sequences in place of logarithmic density. This variation in definitions makes no difference in which sequences are Behrend sequences, because the Davenport–Erdős theorem shows that, for sets of multiples, having natural density one and having logarithmic density one are equivalent.

Derived sequences
When  is a Behrend sequence, one may derive another Behrend sequence by omitting from  any finite number of elements.

Every Behrend sequence may be decomposed into the disjoint union of infinitely many Behrend sequences.

References

Integer sequences